Rams Village Superstars Football Club is a Saint Kitts and Nevis football club from Basseterre.

They usually play in the Saint Kitts and Nevis Premier Division, but due to a conflict between the FA and the majority of the clubs, they didn't take part in 2008/2009.

History
Formerly known just as Superstars, they have won the domestic championship 5 times. The original name is actually Russel Super Stars. Terence Byron is a cofounder and original manager. Samuel Parryall was the original treasurer.

Current squad

Staff

Achievements
SKNFA Premier League
Champions (7): 1980, 1991, 2002–03, 2004–05, 2005–06, 2010–11, 2017-18

Saint Kitts and Nevis National Cup
Champions (5): 1976, 2002–03, 2003–04, 2010–11, 2016–17

Carnival Cup
Champions (3): 2016, 2017, 2018

Easter Cup
Champions (1): 2019

External links
Club profile – SKNFA

Football clubs in Saint Kitts and Nevis